Cowichan-Alberni was a provincial electoral district in the Canadian province of British Columbia.  It appeared in the 1894 general election only. It was formed by combining the Alberni riding and parts of the older Cowichan riding.  Alberni riding and Cowichan riding were restored for the 1898 election.

Demographics

Political geography

Notable elections

First Nations

Notable MLAs

Electoral history 

Note: Winners in each election are in bold.

|-

|- bgcolor="white"
!align="right" colspan=3|Total valid votes
!align="right"| -
!align="right"| - %
!align="right"|
|- bgcolor="white"
!align="right" colspan=3|Total rejected ballots
!align="right"|
!align="right"|
!align="right"|
|- bgcolor="white"
!align="right" colspan=3|Turnout
!align="right"|%
!align="right"|
!align="right"|
|}

|-

|- bgcolor="white"
!align="right" colspan=3|Total valid votes
!align="right"|459
!align="right"|100.00%
!align="right"|
|- bgcolor="white"
!align="right" colspan=3|Total rejected ballots
!align="right"|
!align="right"|
!align="right"|
|- bgcolor="white"
!align="right" colspan=3|Turnout
!align="right"|%
!align="right"|
!align="right"|
|}
2.  Later 14th Premier of British Columbia 1900-1902

|-

|- bgcolor="white"
!align="right" colspan=3|Total valid votes
!align="right"|188
!align="right"|100.00%
!align="right"|
|- bgcolor="white"
!align="right" colspan=3|Total rejected ballots
!align="right"|
!align="right"|
!align="right"|
|- bgcolor="white"
!align="right" colspan=3|Turnout
!align="right"|%
!align="right"|
!align="right"|
|}
3. McPhee was nominated as a Liberal candidate in opposition to Mounce who campaigned as a Conservative Party supporter. According to the Nanaimo Herald both were anti-Martin but the Vancouver Province and Victoria Times listed both as Government.

|-

|Liberal
|Frederick McBain Young
|align="right"|317
|align="right"|46.76%
|align="right"|
|align="right"|unknown
|- bgcolor="white"
!align="right" colspan=3|Total valid votes
!align="right"|678
!align="right"|100.00%
!align="right"|
|- bgcolor="white"
!align="right" colspan=3|Total rejected ballots
!align="right"|
!align="right"|
!align="right"|
|- bgcolor="white"
!align="right" colspan=3|Turnout
!align="right"|%
!align="right"|
!align="right"|
|}

|-

|Liberal
|John Bertram Bennett
|align="right"|292
|align="right"|43.98%
|align="right"|
|align="right"|unknown

|- bgcolor="white"
!align="right" colspan=3|Total valid votes
!align="right"|664
!align="right"|100.00%
!align="right"|
|- bgcolor="white"
!align="right" colspan=3|Total rejected ballots
!align="right"|
!align="right"|
!align="right"|
|- bgcolor="white"
!align="right" colspan=3|Turnout
!align="right"|%
!align="right"|
!align="right"|
|}

|Liberal
|James McKelvey Forrest
|align="right"|172
|align="right"|17.50%
|align="right"|
|align="right"|unknown

|- bgcolor="white"
!align="right" colspan=3|Total valid votes
!align="right"|983
!align="right"|100.00%
!align="right"|
|- bgcolor="white"
!align="right" colspan=3|Total rejected ballots
!align="right"|
!align="right"|
!align="right"|
|- bgcolor="white"
!align="right" colspan=3|Turnout
!align="right"|%
!align="right"|
!align="right"|
|}

|-

|- bgcolor="white"
!align="right" colspan=3|Total valid votes
!align="right"|1,049
!align="right"|100.00%
!align="right"|
|- bgcolor="white"
!align="right" colspan=3|Total rejected ballots
!align="right"|
!align="right"|
!align="right"|
|- bgcolor="white"
!align="right" colspan=3|Turnout
!align="right"|%
!align="right"|
!align="right"|
|}

|-

|Liberal
|Hugh Stewart
|align="right"|916
|align="right"|43.07%
|align="right"|
|align="right"|unknown

|- bgcolor="white"
!align="right" colspan=3|Total valid votes
!align="right"|812
!align="right"|100.00%
!align="right"|
|- bgcolor="white"
!align="right" colspan=3|Total rejected ballots
!align="right"|
!align="right"|
!align="right"|
|- bgcolor="white"
!align="right" colspan=3|Turnout
!align="right"|%
!align="right"|
!align="right"|
|}

|-

|Peoples Party (Farmer-Labour)
|Thomas Menzies
|align="right"|1,354
|align="right"|32.83%
|align="right"|
|align="right"|unknown

|Liberal
|Patrick Daly
|align="right"|806
|align="right"|19.54%
|align="right"|
|align="right"|unknown
|- bgcolor="white"
!align="right" colspan=3|Total valid votes
!align="right"|4,124
!align="right"|100.00%
!align="right"|
|- bgcolor="white"
!align="right" colspan=3|Total rejected ballots
!align="right"|
!align="right"|
!align="right"|
|- bgcolor="white"
!align="right" colspan=3|Turnout
!align="right"|%
!align="right"|
!align="right"|
|}

|-

|- bgcolor="white"
!align="right" colspan=3|Total valid votes
!align="right"|2,869
!align="right"|100.00%

|-

|Co-operative Commonwealth Fed.
|Harold Tuttle Allen
|align="right"|1,590
|align="right"|36.03%
|align="right"|
|align="right"|unknown

|Liberal
|Laurence Arnold Hanna
|align="right"|2,204
|align="right"|49.94%
|align="right"|
|align="right"|unknown

|Independent
|Ernest Richard Tarling
|align="right"|84
|align="right"|1.90%
|align="right"|
|align="right"|unknown
|- bgcolor="white"
!align="right" colspan=3|Total valid votes
!align="right"|4,413
!align="right"|100.00%
!align="right"|
|- bgcolor="white"
!align="right" colspan=3|Total rejected ballots
!align="right"|34
!align="right"|
!align="right"|
|- bgcolor="white"
!align="right" colspan=3|Turnout
!align="right"|%
!align="right"|
!align="right"|
|}

|-

|Co-operative Commonwealth Fed.
|Colin Cameron
|align="right"|2,336
|align="right"|44.83%
|align="right"|
|align="right"|unknown

|Liberal
|Laurence Arnold Hanna
|align="right"|1,876
|align="right"|36.00%
|align="right"|
|align="right"|unknown

|- bgcolor="white"
!align="right" colspan=3|Total valid votes
!align="right"|5,211
!align="right"|100.00%
!align="right"|
|- bgcolor="white"
!align="right" colspan=3|Total rejected ballots
!align="right"|80
!align="right"|
!align="right"|
|- bgcolor="white"
!align="right" colspan=3|Turnout
!align="right"|%
!align="right"|
!align="right"|
|}

|-

|Co-operative Commonwealth Fed.
|Colin Cameron
|align="right"|3,126
|align="right"|45.31%
|align="right"|
|align="right"|unknown

|Liberal
|William Edward Mantle
|align="right"|2,158
|align="right"|31.28%
|align="right"|
|align="right"|unknown

|- bgcolor="white"
!align="right" colspan=3|Total valid votes
!align="right"|6,899
!align="right"|100.00%
!align="right"|
|- bgcolor="white"
!align="right" colspan=3|Total rejected ballots
!align="right"|166
!align="right"|
!align="right"|
|- bgcolor="white"
!align="right" colspan=3|Turnout
!align="right"|%
!align="right"|
!align="right"|
|}

|-

|Co-operative Commonwealth Fed.
|Colin Cameron
|align="right"|3,362
|align="right"|44.69%
|align="right"|
|align="right"|unknown

|- bgcolor="white"
!align="right" colspan=3|Total valid votes
!align="right"|7,523
!align="right"|100.00%
!align="right"|
|- bgcolor="white"
!align="right" colspan=3|Total rejected ballots
!align="right"|161
!align="right"|
!align="right"|
|- bgcolor="white"
!align="right" colspan=3|Turnout
!align="right"|%
!align="right"|
!align="right"|
|}

|-

|Co-operative Commonwealth Fed.
|Colin Cameron
|align="right"|5,238
|align="right"|40.81%
|align="right"|
|align="right"|unknown

|- bgcolor="white"
!align="right" colspan=3|Total valid votes
!align="right"|12,834
!align="right"|100.00%
!align="right"|
|- bgcolor="white"
!align="right" colspan=3|Total rejected ballots
!align="right"|435
!align="right"|
!align="right"|
|- bgcolor="white"
!align="right" colspan=3|Turnout
!align="right"|%
!align="right"|
!align="right"|
|}

|-

|Progressive Conservative
|W. Bruce Gordon
|align="right"|1,868
|align="right"|13.58%
|align="right"|--
|align="right"|--.--%
|align="right"|
|align="right"|unknown

|Co-operative Commonwealth Fed.
|William Campbell Moore
|align="right"|5,369
|align="right"|39.03%
|align="right"|7,098
|align="right"|57.67%
|align="right"|
|align="right"|unknown

|Liberal
|Herbert John Welch
|align="right"|3,532
|align="right"|25.68%
|align="right"|5,210
|align="right"|42.33%
|align="right"|
|align="right"|unknown
|- bgcolor="white"
!align="right" colspan=3|Total valid votes
!align="right"|13,756
!align="right"|100.00%
!align="right"|12,308
!align="right"|%
!align="right"|
|- bgcolor="white"
!align="right" colspan=3|Total rejected ballots
!align="right"|446
!align="right"|
!align="right"|
|- bgcolor="white"
!align="right" colspan=3|Turnout
!align="right"|77.94%
!align="right"|
!align="right"|
|- bgcolor="white"
!align="right" colspan=9|1(Preferential ballot: 1st and 3rd counts of three shown only) 	
|}

|-

|Liberal
|John Wesley Baikie
|align="right"|2,944 	 	
|align="right"|21.71%
|align="right"|-
|align="right"|-.-%
|align="right"|
|align="right"|unknown

|Labour Progressive Party
|John Higgin
|align="right"|357 	 	
|align="right"|2.63%
|align="right"|-
|align="right"|-.-%
|align="right"|
|align="right"|unknown

|Co-operative Commonwealth Fed.
|William Campbell Moore
|align="right"|5,462
|align="right"|40.28%
|align="right"|6,717
|align="right"|53.83%
|align="right"|
|align="right"|unknown

|Progressive Conservative
|Nugent Watson Spinks
|align="right"|378
|align="right"|2.79%
|align="right"|--
|align="right"|--.--%
|align="right"|
|align="right"|unknown
|- bgcolor="white"
!align="right" colspan=3|Total valid votes
!align="right"|13,561 	  	
!align="right"|100.00%
!align="right"|12,479 	
!align="right"|%
!align="right"|
|- bgcolor="white"
!align="right" colspan=3|Total rejected ballots
!align="right"|717
!align="right"|
!align="right"|
|- bgcolor="white"
!align="right" colspan=3|Turnout
!align="right"|77.94%
!align="right"|
!align="right"|
|- bgcolor="white"
!align="right" colspan=9|2Preferential ballot: 1st and 4th counts of four shown only) 	
|}

|-

|Liberal
|Robert George McPhee
|align="right"|2,339
|align="right"|19.81%
|align="right"|
|align="right"|unknown

|Co-operative Commonwealth Fed.
|Cyril Newman
|align="right"|4,555
|align="right"|38.57%
|align="right"|
|align="right"|unknown
|- bgcolor="white"
!align="right" colspan=3|Total valid votes
!align="right"|11,810
!align="right"|100.00%
!align="right"|
|- bgcolor="white"
!align="right" colspan=3|Total valid votes
!align="right"|11,810
!align="right"|100.00%
!align="right"|
|- bgcolor="white"
!align="right" colspan=3|Total rejected ballots
!align="right"|183
!align="right"|
!align="right"|
|- bgcolor="white"
!align="right" colspan=3|Turnout
!align="right"|%
!align="right"|
!align="right"|
|}

|-

|Liberal
|William Wallace Baikie
|align="right"|2,759
|align="right"|17.47%
|align="right"|
|align="right"|unknown

|Progressive Conservative
|Alan Gray
|align="right"|653
|align="right"|4.14%
|align="right"|
|align="right"|unknown

|Co-operative Commonwealth Fed.
|Frederick Charles Wood
|align="right"|6,072
|align="right"|38.45%
|align="right"|
|align="right"|unknown
|- bgcolor="white"
!align="right" colspan=3|Total valid votes
!align="right"|15,791
!align="right"|100.00%
!align="right"|
|- bgcolor="white"
!align="right" colspan=3|Total rejected ballots
!align="right"|248
!align="right"|
!align="right"|
|- bgcolor="white"
!align="right" colspan=3|Turnout
!align="right"|%
!align="right"|
!align="right"|
|}

|-

|Liberal
|David Alexander Elrix
|align="right"|1,259
|align="right"|8.09%
|align="right"|
|align="right"|unknown

|Progressive Conservative
|Duncan McIntyre Fraser
|align="right"|1,475
|align="right"|9.47%
|align="right"|
|align="right"|unknown

|- bgcolor="white"
!align="right" colspan=3|Total valid votes
!align="right"|15,570
!align="right"|100.00%
!align="right"|
|- bgcolor="white"
!align="right" colspan=3|Total rejected ballots
!align="right"|150
!align="right"|
!align="right"|
|- bgcolor="white"
!align="right" colspan=3|Turnout
!align="right"|%
!align="right"|
!align="right"|
|}

|-

|Liberal
|Joseph J. Cvetkovich
|align="right"|1,276
|align="right"|11.57%
|align="right"|
|align="right"|unknown

|- bgcolor="white"
!align="right" colspan=3|Total valid votes
!align="right"|11,033
!align="right"|100.00%
!align="right"|
|- bgcolor="white"
!align="right" colspan=3|Total rejected ballots
!align="right"|104
!align="right"|
!align="right"|
|- bgcolor="white"
!align="right" colspan=3|Turnout
!align="right"|%
!align="right"|
!align="right"|
|}

|-

|Liberal
|Olga Ruth Henrietta Chown
|align="right"|2,303
|align="right"|13.28%
|align="right"|
|align="right"|unknown

|- bgcolor="white"
!align="right" colspan=3|Total valid votes
!align="right"|17,344
!align="right"|100.00%
!align="right"|
|- bgcolor="white"
!align="right" colspan=3|Total rejected ballots
!align="right"|194
!align="right"|
!align="right"|
|- bgcolor="white"
!align="right" colspan=3|Turnout
!align="right"|%
!align="right"|
!align="right"|
|}

|-

|Progressive Conservative
|Lawrence Foort
|align="right"|1,166
|align="right"|5.30%
|align="right"|
|align="right"|unknown

|Liberal
|Patrick Melvin Thompson
|align="right"|1,903
|align="right"|8.66%
|align="right"|
|align="right"|unknown
|- bgcolor="white"
!align="right" colspan=3|Total valid votes
!align="right"|21,985
!align="right"|100.00%
!align="right"|
|- bgcolor="white"
!align="right" colspan=3|Total rejected ballots
!align="right"|135
!align="right"|
!align="right"|
|- bgcolor="white"
!align="right" colspan=3|Turnout
!align="right"|%
!align="right"|
!align="right"|
|}

|-

|Liberal
|Norman L. McLaren
|align="right"|1,381
|align="right"|5.28%
|align="right"|
|align="right"|unknown

|Progressive Conservative
|Victor Albert Stephens
|align="right"|3,906
|align="right"|15.09%
|align="right"|
|align="right"|unknown
|- bgcolor="white"
!align="right" colspan=3|Total valid votes
!align="right"|26,148
!align="right"|100.00%
!align="right"|
|- bgcolor="white"
!align="right" colspan=3|Total rejected ballots
!align="right"|454
!align="right"|
!align="right"|
|- bgcolor="white"
!align="right" colspan=3|Turnout
!align="right"|%
!align="right"|
!align="right"|
|}

|-

|Progressive Conservative
|Eric Harry Kellow
|align="right"|2,251
|align="right"|10.20%
|align="right"|
|align="right"|unknown

|- bgcolor="white"
!align="right" colspan=3|Total valid votes
!align="right"|22,061
!align="right"|100.00%
!align="right"|
|- bgcolor="white"
!align="right" colspan=3|Total rejected ballots
!align="right"|315
!align="right"|
!align="right"|
|- bgcolor="white"
!align="right" colspan=3|Turnout
!align="right"|%
!align="right"|
!align="right"|
|}

|-

|Liberal
|Thomas John Finnie
|align="right"|502
|align="right"|1.71%
|align="right"|
|align="right"|unknown

|Independent
|Victor Albert Stephens
|align="right"|705
|align="right"|2.39%
|align="right"|
|align="right"|unknown
|- bgcolor="white"
!align="right" colspan=3|Total valid votes
!align="right"|29,452
!align="right"|100.00%
!align="right"|
|- bgcolor="white"
!align="right" colspan=3|Total rejected ballots
!align="right"|258
!align="right"|
!align="right"|
|- bgcolor="white"
!align="right" colspan=3|Turnout
!align="right"|%
!align="right"|
!align="right"|
|}

|Liberal
|John G. (Jack) Setter
|align="right"|985
|align="right"|3.18%
|align="right"|
|align="right"|unknown

|Progressive Conservative
|Terry Ian
|align="right"|573
|align="right"|1.85%
|align="right"|
|align="right"|unknown
|- bgcolor="white"
!align="right" colspan=3|Total valid votes
!align="right"|30,953
!align="right"|100.00%
!align="right"|
|- bgcolor="white"
!align="right" colspan=3|Total rejected ballots
!align="right"|276
!align="right"|
!align="right"|
|- bgcolor="white"
!align="right" colspan=3|Turnout
!align="right"|%
!align="right"|
!align="right"|
|}

Sources 

Elections BC historical returns

Former provincial electoral districts of British Columbia on Vancouver Island